Nevell is a surname of Norman origin. It is a variation of the surname Neville.

 John Nevell (died 1697), English vice-admiral
 Stanley R. Nevell, English architect; see Market Street, Cambridge
 William Nevell (1916–1978), English cricketer

See also
 Nevelle Clarke, American football player
 Neville (disambiguation)

References